Alexis Rodney is a British actor known for his work in Films such as Guardians of the Galaxy, Killing Jesus, and Buffalo Soldiers.

Biography & career
Rodney started acting in 1997 at the National Youth Theatre of Great Britain. In 1998, he successfully auditioned for the seminal BBC Film Storm Damage.

Rodney will be appearing in The Gentlemen, Guy Ritchie's Netflix series set to premiere in 2023. As well as in  the Dungeons and Dragons movie and upcoming dark comedy Young Gun.

He has appeared in Outlander, Street Fighter: Resurrection, and Pennyworth among others.

Selected filmography

References

External links

Living people
British film actors
21st-century British actors
British male film actors
Year of birth missing (living people)